Soame may refer to:

Soame Jenyns (1704–1787), English writer and Member of Parliament
Roger Soame Jenyns (1904–1976), British art historian
Steven Soame (c.1540–1619), English merchant and politician
Thomas Soame (1584–1671), English politician

See also
Soames (disambiguation)